Mongolia participated in the 1978 Asian Games held in from December 9, 1978 to December 20, 1978 in Bangkok, Thailand.

Medal summary

Medals by sport

Medalists

Boxing

Wrestling

References

External links

Nations at the 1978 Asian Games
1978